Christian "Ian" Moss (born 3 April 1963 from Oxfordshire) is a former English professional darts player who has played in the Professional Darts Corporation (PDC) tournaments.

Career
Moss reached the final of the qualifier for the 2014 PDC World Championship, but was whitewashed 5–0 by Matt Clark. However, for winning through to the final he earned a spot in the preliminary round of the event where he was beaten 4–3 by New Zealand's Rob Szabo. Moss entered Qualifying School in January 2014 and finished eighth on the Order of Merit to earn a two-year PDC tour card. His deepest run during the year came at the fifth Players Championship where he lost 6–4 in the last 32 to Wayne Jones.

At the 2015 UK Open, Moss defeated Adi Acott and Connie Finnan, before losing 5–3 to Christian Kist in the second round. In May at the 10th Players Championship, Moss beat Roxy-James Rodriguez, Terry Jenkins and Stuart Kellett to reach the last 16 of a PDC event for the first time, but lost 6–2 to Keegan Brown. He won through to the final of the non-ranking Worthingtons Darts Champion of Champions event where he lost 2–0 in sets to Gerwyn Price. Moss had one last 16 appearance in a Challenge Tour event in 2016 and had no success in the main Pro Tour events.

Ian Moss stopped playing PDC Events in 2018.

World Championship results

PDC
 2014: Preliminary round (lost to Rob Szabo 3–4) (legs)

References

External links

Living people
1963 births
English darts players
Professional Darts Corporation former tour card holders